ACIP may refer to:

 Advisory Committee on Immunization Practices, US
 Audio Contribution over IP

See also
 ASIP (disambiguation)